Guzmania graminifolia is a species of flowering plant in the Bromeliaceae family. It is native to Ecuador, Peru, Colombia and Panama.

References

graminifolia
Flora of Panama
Flora of South America
Plants described in 1887
Taxa named by Édouard André
Taxa named by John Gilbert Baker
Taxa named by Lyman Bradford Smith